Oligolactoria bubiki is an extinct prehistoric boxfish that lived during the Rupelian epoch from the Middle Oligocene of Moravia, Czech Republic.

In life, it would have strongly resembled a modern cowfish (genus Lactoria).

See also

 Eolactoria
 Prehistoric fish
 List of prehistoric bony fish

References

Oligocene fish
Ostraciidae
Paleogene fish of Europe
Fossil taxa described in 1991